This list of museums in Connecticut contains museums which are defined for this context as institutions (including nonprofit organizations, government entities, and private businesses) that collect and care for objects of cultural, artistic, scientific, or historical interest and make their collections or related exhibits available for public viewing.  Non-profit and university art galleries are also included. Museums that exist only in cyberspace (i.e., virtual museums) are not included.

Inclusion in this list is generally for institutions with the name "museum" in the title. Some other institutions not included here are very like museums, and some "museums" here don't fit the typical definition of a place that shows exhibits. The Lockwood–Mathews Mansion Museum, for instance, is a historic mansion in which the "exhibit" is essentially the building itself. For Wikipedia links to institutions similar to museums in Connecticut, consult the "See also" section.

Museums

Defunct museums
 Bristol Military Memorial Museum, Bristol - collections now at the Bristol Historical Society
 Burndy Library - formerly in Norwalk, collection is now in The Huntington Library in San Marino, California and in the Smithsonian Institution in Washington, D.C.
 Children's Garbage Museum, Stratford - closed in 2011
 Connecticut Cellar Savers Fire Museum, Portland
 Connecticut Sports Museum & Hall of Fame - formerly located in the Hartford Civic Center, 2nd floor
 Day-Lewis Museum of Indian Artifacts, Farmington - owned by Yale University, formerly operated by the Farmington Historical Society, collection of Tunxis artifacts found on the grounds of the Lewis Walpole Library, closed in 2005 
 Dequaine Museums, Meriden - included National Shaving & Barbershop Museum, Frank Chiarenza Museum of Glass, Rosa Ponselle Museum,
 Edward E. King Museum, East Hartford, information, collection of aviation and tobacco memorabilia, now spread throughout the East Hartford Public Library but not as a separate museum
 Farm Implement Museum, Bloomfield - was dedicated to the history of farming in New England and displayed farm tools dating from the 1790s
 Golden Age of Trucking Museum, Middlebury- antique trucks, carriages and collectibles, closed July, 2010; website 
 Hartford Police Museum, Hartford - formerly located at 101 Pearl Street, confirmed closed by phone 2/12/08
 Hitchcock Museum, Riverton - collection of furnishings from the Hitchcock Chair Company, closed in 2003
 Holley-Williams House Museum, Lakeville - previously operated by the Salisbury Association, sold to private owner 
 Horse Guard Cavalry Museum,  Avon - museum is now just a case with uniforms 
 Huntington House Museum, Windsor, closed in 2005, now private 
 Kerosene Lamp Museum, Winchester
 Menczer Museum of Medicine and Dentistry, Hartford - operated by the Hartford Medical Society, closed in 2008, collections now at area hospitals and Tunxis Community College
 Museum of American Political Life, West Hartford - collection of political campaign memorabilia, formerly in the Harry Jack Gray Center at University of Hartford, closed in 2003
 National Purple Heart Museum, Enfield - proposed museum, never completed
 Nehemiah Royce House, Wallingford - now private
 Neil's American Dream Museum, West Hartford  New York Times, "WEST HARTFORD JOURNAL; A Museum Enshrines a Simpler Era's Dreams", January 21, 1993
 New England Center for the Contemporary Arts, Brooklyn 
 New England Muscle Bicycle Museum, Bloomfield 
 Norwalk Museum, Norwalk - closed in 2012 
 Nut Museum, Old Lyme 
 Photomobile Model Museum, Woodstock - solar electric small-scale car, boat, plane, train and maglev vehicles
 Salisbury Cannon Museum, Lakeville - currently closed;  Salisbury Cannon Museum website
 Skitch Henderson Museum, New Milford, formerly part of Hunt Hill Farm
 Somers Mountain Museum, Somers - collection of Native American and early settler tools 
 Submarine Library and Museum, Middletown - closed in 2003, collection now in St. Marys Submarine Museum, St. Marys, Georgia
Timexpo Museum, Waterbury, closed in 2015

See also
 Aquaria: :Category:Aquaria in Connecticut
 Botanical gardens: :Category:Botanical gardens in Connecticut
 Historical societies: List of historical societies#Connecticut
 Libraries: :Category:Libraries in Connecticut
 Nature centers: List of nature centers in Connecticut 
 Observatories: :Category:Astronomical observatories in Connecticut

References

External links
 Connecticut Humanities directory of towns including references to museums
 Visit Connecticut
 CTMQ, formerly Connecticut Museum Quest
 Historic Buildings of Connecticut
 Jerry Dougherty's CONNECTICUT, photos of towns and sites in Connecticut, including some museums

Connecticut

Museums
Museums
Museums